Sir John Chichester, 1st Baronet (23 April 1623 – 4 November 1667) lord of the manor of Raleigh in the parish of Pilton in Devon, was an English landowner and politician who sat in the House of Commons from 1661 to 1667.

Origins
He was the son and heir of Sir Robert Chichester (d.1627), K.B., of Raleigh, Devon by his second wife Mary Hill, a daughter of Robert Hill (d.1637) of Shilston in the parish of Modbury in Devon.

Career
He succeeded to Raleigh on the death of his father on 24 April 1627. He was created a baronet on 4 August 1641. In 1661 Chichester was elected a Member of Parliament for Barnstaple (adjacent to Raleigh) in the Cavalier Parliament and sat until his death in 1667 at the age of about 44.

Marriages and children
Chichester married twice:
Firstly to Elizabeth Rayney (d.1654), a daughter of Sir John Rayney, 1st Baronet (1601–1661) of Wrotham in Kent, by his first wife Catharine Style, a daughter of Thomas Style. By his first wife he had children including:
Sir John Chichester, 2nd Baronet (c. 1658-16 September 1680) 
Sir Arthur Chichester, 3rd Baronet (c. 1662-3 February 1718), (Since his first wife died in 1654 this has to be an error. Burke's Peerage says has first wife Elizabeth died without issue, suggesting that sons John and Arthur are both children of Mary Colley (as BP states).)
Henry
Secondly to Mary Colly, a daughter of Theodore Colly and widow of George Warcup, a merchant of the City of London. She is recorded as a widow, in the parish of St. Anne's, Blackfriars, on 18 July 1655.

References

1623 births
1667 deaths
English MPs 1661–1679
Baronets in the Baronetage of England
Members of the Parliament of England (pre-1707) for Barnstaple
English landowners
Chichester family